Insane Poetry is an American hip hop group from Los Angeles, California. Formed in 1988, it is considered to be one of the first horrorcore groups.

History
The group was formed by Cyco, then known as Psycho (born Andrew "Drew" Holiman, on April 29, 1967, in Los Angeles, California), after he was hired as a disc jockey at a Los Angeles radio station, KDAY. With members DJ Streek and Shakespear the One-Man Riot, Insane Poetry released its debut single, "Twelve Strokes Till Midnight," in 1988. After replacing Shakespear with Em-Dee, Insane Poetry signed with Nastymix/Ichiban Records through an association with emcee Rodney O and released its debut album, Grim Reality, in 1992, which peaked at #98 on the Billboard Top R&B/Hip-Hop Albums chart. After Nastymix went out of business, Insane Poetry signed with independent React Records, which released its second album, Blacc Plague, in 1996, but disagreements over promotion and support led the group to leave the label. In 1998, Cyco appeared on Vanilla Ice's Hard to Swallow album, followed by collaborations with M-Boogie, Dilated Peoples, and DJ Revolution. In 2001, Cyco hooked up with producer Jason "JP Tha Hustler" Pearl and together they formed Grim Reality Entertainment. In 2003, Insane Poetry released Faith in Chaos. In 2007, the group released Fallen From Grace with nationwide distribution through Long Range/Koch Records. It was announced at Black X-Mas 2010 that he was part of Lyrikal Snuff Productions. Insane Poetry collaborated on a song with Las Vegas-based hip hop group War Paint, titled "Wasted", in 2013 on the Bloodstepp track "Underground All-Stars (The Anthem)" from the album Bass And Bubblegum and in 2014 on Ware-Wolff's "Lycanthropy (TMTM Remix)". Insane Poetry has also been on numerous Grim Reality Entertainment CDs since, including Grim Reality Entertainment Music Collection Vol. 1, GRE for the Radio Music Collection Vol. 2, Corporate Takeover, New Breed, JP tha Hustler's 100% Hardcore, VD's Hardcore Hip Hop, and Nekro G's Reel Street Musik

Discography

Albums
1992: Grim Reality
1996: Blacc Plague
2003: Faith in Chaos (Book of Revelations)
2007: Fallen from Grace
2008: Sutter Kain Presents Cyco the Snuff Reels
2013: Random Acts of Violence (as M.M.M.F.D. With Scum of LSP)
2014: Killaborations
2016: Unsubs (as M.M.M.F.D. With Scum of LSP)
2017: The Snuff Reels Director's Cut: The Birth Of Richard Hansen
2018  Team Guillotine (as Team Guillotine with JP Tha Hustler of LSP)
2018: Butcher Brothaz (as M.M.M.F.D. With Scum of LSP)
2020: Deadly Drug (as M.M.M.F.D. With Scum of LSP)
2021: Wicked Killagraphy
2022: Violent Art (The Album)

Compilations
2008: History: Rare & Unreleased
2012: The Best of Insane Poetry

Mixtapes
2012: Insane Poetry Presents Prelude to Edgar Allan Holiman — Creative Destruction The Mixtape

EPs
2016: ''Violent Art EP

References

External links
Official Web Site

Hip hop groups from California
Musical groups from Los Angeles
Hip hop collectives
Horrorcore groups
Underground hip hop groups